Balanced ternary is a ternary numeral system (i.e. base 3 with three digits) that uses a balanced signed-digit representation of the integers in which the digits have the values −1, 0, and 1. This stands in contrast to the standard (unbalanced) ternary system, in which digits have values 0, 1 and 2. 
The balanced ternary system can represent all integers without using a separate minus sign; the value of the leading non-zero digit of a number has the sign of the number itself. The balanced ternary system is an example of a non-standard positional numeral system. It was used in some early computers and also in some solutions of balance puzzles.

Different sources use different glyphs used to represent the three digits in balanced ternary. In this article, T (which resembles a ligature of the minus sign and 1) represents −1, while 0 and 1 represent themselves. Other conventions include using '−' and '+' to represent −1 and 1 respectively, or using Greek letter theta (Θ), which resembles a minus sign in a circle, to represent −1. In publications about the Setun computer, −1 is represented as overturned 1: "1".

Balanced ternary makes an early appearance in Michael Stifel's book Arithmetica Integra (1544). It also occurs in the works of Johannes Kepler and Léon Lalanne. Related signed-digit schemes in other bases have been discussed by John Colson, John Leslie, Augustin-Louis Cauchy, and possibly even the ancient Indian Vedas.

Definition 

Let  denote the set of symbols (also called glyphs or characters) , where the symbol  is sometimes used in place of  
Define an integer-valued function  by

 
 and

where the right hand sides are integers with their usual (decimal) values. This function,  is what rigorously and formally establishes how integer values are assigned to the symbols/glyphs in  One benefit of this formalism is that the definition of "the integers" (however they may be defined) is not conflated with any particular system for writing/representing them; in this way, these two distinct (albeit closely related) concepts are kept separate.

The set  together with the function  forms a balanced signed-digit representation called the balanced ternary system. 
It can be used to represent integers and real numbers.

Ternary integer evaluation 

The ternary evaluation is the function  defined by assigning to every string  the integer

The string  represents (with respect to ) the integer  The value  may alternatively be denoted by  
The map  is surjective but not injective since, for example,  However, every integer has exactly one representation under  that does not end (on the left) with the symbol  i.e. 

If  and  then  satisfies:

which shows that  satisfies a sort of recurrence relation. This recurrence relation has the initial condition
 
where  is the empty string.

This implies that for every string 

which in words says that leading  symbols (to the left in a string with 2 or more symbols) do not affect the resulting value.

and using the above recurrence relation

Conversion to decimal 

In the balanced ternary system the value of a digit n places left of the radix point is the product of the digit and 3n. This is useful when converting between decimal and balanced ternary. In the following the strings denoting balanced ternary carry the suffix, bal3. For instance,
 10bal3 = 1 × 31 + 0 × 30 = 310
 10𝖳bal3 = 1 × 32 + 0 × 31 + (−1) × 30 = 810
 −910 = −1 × 32 + 0 × 31 + 0 × 30 = 𝖳00bal3
 810 = 1 × 32 + 0 × 31 + (−1) × 30 = 10𝖳bal3

Similarly, the first place to the right of the radix point holds 3−1 = , the second place holds 3−2 = , and so on. For instance,
 −10 = −1 +  = −1 × 30 + 1 × 3−1 = 𝖳.1bal3.

An integer is divisible by three if and only if the digit in the units place is zero.

We may check the parity of a balanced ternary integer by checking the parity of the sum of all trits. This sum has the same parity as the integer itself.

Balanced ternary can also be extended to fractional numbers similar to how decimal numbers are written to the right of the radix point.

{| class="wikitable"
|-
! Decimal
! style="text-align: right" | −0.9
! style="text-align: right" | −0.8
! style="text-align: right" | −0.7
! style="text-align: right" | −0.6
! style="text-align: right" | −0.5
! style="text-align: right" | −0.4
! style="text-align: right" | −0.3
! style="text-align: right" | −0.2
! style="text-align: right" | −0.1
! style="text-align: right" |  0
|-
! Balanced Ternary 
| 𝖳.||𝖳.|| 𝖳.|| 𝖳.|| 0. or 𝖳. || 0. || 0. || 0. || 0. || 0
|-
! Decimal
! style="text-align: right" | 0.9
! style="text-align: right" | 0.8
! style="text-align: right" | 0.7
! style="text-align: right" | 0.6
! style="text-align: right" | 0.5
! style="text-align: right" | 0.4
! style="text-align: right" | 0.3
! style="text-align: right" | 0.2
! style="text-align: right" | 0.1
! style="text-align: right" | 0
|-
! Balanced Ternary 
| 1.||1.|| 1.|| 1.|| 0. or 1. || 0. || 0. || 0. || 0. || 0
|}

In decimal or binary, integer values and terminating fractions have multiple representations. For example,  = 0.1 = 0.1 = 0.0. And,  = 0.12 = 0.12 = 0.02. Some balanced ternary fractions have multiple representations too. For example,  = 0.1bal3 = 0.0bal3. Certainly, in the decimal and binary, we may omit the rightmost trailing infinite 0s after the radix point and gain a representations of integer or terminating fraction. But, in balanced ternary, we can't omit the rightmost trailing infinite −1s after the radix point in order to gain a representations of integer or terminating fraction.

Donald Knuth has pointed out that truncation and rounding are the same operation in balanced ternary—they produce exactly the same result (a property shared with other balanced numeral systems). The number  is not exceptional; it has two equally valid representations, and two equally valid truncations: 0. (round to 0, and truncate to 0) and 1. (round to 1, and truncate to 1). With an odd radix, double rounding is also equivalent to directly rounding to the final precision, unlike with an even radix.

The basic operations—addition, subtraction, multiplication, and division—are done as in regular ternary. Multiplication by two can be done by adding a number to itself, or subtracting itself after a-trit-left-shifting.

An arithmetic shift left of a balanced ternary number is the equivalent of multiplication by a (positive, integral) power of 3; and an arithmetic shift right of a balanced ternary number is the equivalent of division by a (positive, integral) power of 3.

Conversion to and from a fraction

The conversion of a repeating balanced ternary number to a fraction is analogous to converting a repeating decimal. For example (because of 111111bal3 =10):

Irrational numbers
As in any other integer base, algebraic irrationals and transcendental numbers do not terminate or repeat. For example: 
{| class="wikitable"
!Decimal !! Balanced ternary
|-
| || 
|-
| || 
|-
| || 
|-
| || 
|-
| || 
|-
| || 
|-
| || 
|}

Conversion from ternary 
Unbalanced ternary can be converted to balanced ternary notation in two ways: 
Add 1 trit-by-trit from the first non-zero trit with carry, and then subtract 1 trit-by-trit from the same trit without borrow. For example,
 0213 + 113 = 1023, 1023 − 113 = 1T1bal3 = 710.
If a 2 is present in ternary, turn it into 1T. For example,
 02123 = 0010bal3 + 1T00bal3 + 001Tbal3 = 10TTbal3 = 2310

If the three values of ternary logic are false, unknown and true, and these are mapped to balanced ternary as T, 0 and 1 and to conventional unsigned ternary values as 0, 1 and 2, then balanced ternary can be viewed as a biased number system analogous to the offset binary system.
If the ternary number has n trits, then the bias b is

which is represented as all ones in either conventional or biased form.

As a result, if these two representations are used for balanced and unsigned ternary numbers, an unsigned n-trit positive ternary value can be converted to balanced form by adding the bias b and a positive balanced number can be converted to unsigned form by subtracting the bias b.  Furthermore, if x and y are balanced numbers, their balanced sum is  when computed using conventional unsigned ternary arithmetic. Similarly, if x and y are conventional unsigned ternary numbers, their sum is  when computed using balanced ternary arithmetic.

Conversion to balanced ternary from any integer base

We may convert to balanced ternary with the following formula:

where,
 anan−1...a1a0.c1c2c3... is the original representation in the original numeral system. 
 b is the original radix. b is 10 if converting from decimal.
 ak and ck are the digits k places to the left and right of the radix point respectively.

For instance,
  −25.410 = −(1T×1011 + 1TT×1010 + 11×101−1)
           = −(1T×101 + 1TT + 11÷101)
           = −10T1.
           =  T01T.

  1010.12 = 1T10 + 1T1 + 1T−1
            = 10T + 1T + 0.
            = 101.

Addition, subtraction and multiplication and division 
The single-trit addition, subtraction, multiplication and division tables are shown below. For subtraction and division, which are not commutative, the first operand is given to the left of the table, while the second is given at the top. For instance, the answer to 1 − T = 1T is found in the bottom left corner of the subtraction table.
{|
|
 :{| class="wikitable" style="width: 8em; text-align: center;"
 |+ Addition
 |- align="right"
 ! + !! T !! 0 !! 1
 |-
 |-
 ! T 
 | T1 || T || 0
 |-
 ! 0 
 | T || 0 || 1
 |-
 ! 1 
 | 0 || 1 || 1T
 |}
|
 :{| class="wikitable" style="width: 8em; text-align: center;"
 |+ Subtraction
 |- align="right"
 ! − !! T !! 0 !! 1
 |-
 ! T
 | 0 || T || T1
 |-
 ! 0
 | 1 || 0 || T
 |-
 ! 1
 | 1T || 1 || 0
 |}
|
 :{| class="wikitable" style="width: 8em; text-align: center;"
 |+ Multiplication
 |- align="right"
 ! × !! T !! 0 !! 1
 |-
 |-
 ! T 
 | 1 || 0 || T
 |-
 ! 0 
 | 0 || 0 || 0
 |-
 ! 1 
 | T || 0 || 1
 |}
|
 :{| class="wikitable" style="text-align: center;"
 |+ Division
 |- align="right"
 ! ÷ !! T !! 1
 |-
 |-
 ! T
 | 1 || T
 |-
 ! 0
 | 0 || 0
 |-
 ! 1
 | T || 1
 |}
|}

Multi-trit addition and subtraction

Multi-trit addition and subtraction is analogous to that of binary and decimal. Add and subtract trit by trit, and add the carry appropriately.
For example:

            1TT1TT.1TT1              1TT1TT.1TT1            1TT1TT.1TT1          1TT1TT.1TT1
          +   11T1.T                −  11T1.T              −  11T1.T     →     +   TT1T.1
         __          __                               ___
            1T0T10.0TT1              1T1001.TTT1                                 1T1001.TTT1
          +   1T                   +  T  T1                                    + T  T
          __                                      
            1T1110.0TT1              1110TT.TTT1                                 1110TT.TTT1
          +   T                    + T   1                                     + T   1
          __                                      
            1T0110.0TT1               1100T.TTT1                                  1100T.TTT1

Multi-trit multiplication

Multi-trit multiplication is analogous to that of binary and decimal.

        1TT1.TT
    ×   T11T.1
    _
         1TT.1TT multiply 1
        T11T.11  multiply T
       1TT1T.T   multiply 1
      1TT1TT     multiply 1
     T11T11      multiply T
    _
     0T0000T.10T

Multi-trit division
Balanced ternary division is analogous to that of binary and decimal.

However, 0.510 = 0.1111...bal3 or 1.TTTT...bal3. If the dividend over the plus or minus half divisor, the trit of the quotient must be 1 or T. If the dividend is between the plus and minus of half the divisor, the trit of the quotient is 0. The magnitude of the dividend must be compared with that of half the divisor before setting the quotient trit. For example,

                          1TT1.TT      quotient
 0.5 × divisor  T01.0 _                
       divisor T11T.1 ) T0000T.10T     dividend             
                       T11T1                        T000 < T010, set 1
                      ___
                        1T1T0
                        1TT1T                      1T1T0 > 10T0, set T 
                       ___
                          111T
                         1TT1T                      111T > 10T0, set T
                        ___
                           T00.1
                          T11T.1                    T001 < T010, set 1
                         
                           1T1.00
                           1TT.1T                  1T100 > 10T0, set T
                          
                            1T.T1T
                            1T.T1T                 1TT1T > 10T0, set T
                           
                                 0
Another example,
                            1TTT
        0.5 × divisor 1T  ___
             Divisor  11  )1T01T                   1T = 1T, but 1T.01 > 1T, set 1
                           11
                          _
                           T10                    T10 < T1, set T
                            TT
                          __
                            T11                   T11 < T1, set T
                             TT
                           __
                              TT                   TT < T1, set T
                              TT
                             
                               0
Another example,
                            101.TTTTTTTTT... 
                         or 100.111111111... 
        0.5 × divisor 1T  _
             divisor  11  )111T                    11 > 1T, set 1
                           11
                          _
                             1                     T1 < 1 < 1T, set 0
                            ___
                             1T                    1T = 1T, trits end, set 1.TTTTTTTTT... or 0.111111111...

Square roots and cube roots
The process of extracting the square root in balanced ternary is analogous to that in decimal or binary. 

As in division, we should check the value of half the divisor first. For example,
                              1. 1 1 T 1 T T 0 0 ... 
                            _
                           √ 1T                          1<1T<11, set 1
                            − 1
                             _
                   1×10=10    1.0T                       1.0T>0.10, set 1
                       1T0   −1.T0
                             
                   11×10=110    1T0T                     1T0T>110, set 1
                        10T0   −10T0
                               
                  111×10=1110    T1T0T                   T1T0T<TTT0, set T
                        100T0   −T0010
                                _
                 111T×10=111T0    1TTT0T                 1TTT0T>111T0, set 1
                        10T110   −10T110
                                 __
                111T1×10=111T10    TT1TT0T               TT1TT0T<TTT1T0, set T
                        100TTT0   −T001110
                                  ___
               111T1T×10=111T1T0    T001TT0T             T001TT0T<TTT1T10, set T
                        10T11110   −T01TTTT0
                                   
                111T1TT×10=111T1TT0    T001T0T           TTT1T110<T001T0T<111T1TT0, set 0
                                      −      T           Return 1
                                      ___
              111T1TT0×10=111T1TT00    T001T000T         TTT1T1100<T001T000T<111T1TT00, set 0
                                      −        T         Return 1
                                      _
            111T1TT00*10=111T1TT000    T001T00000T
                                              ... 
Extraction of the cube root in balanced ternary is similarly analogous to extraction in decimal or binary: 
 
Like division, we should check the value of half the divisor first too.
For example:
                               1.  1   T  1  0 ... 
                             _
                           ³√ 1T
                             − 1                 1<1T<10T,set 1
                             ___
                               1.000
               1×100=100      −0.100             borrow 100×, do division
                              ___
                       1TT     1.T00             1T00>1TT, set 1
           1×1×1000+1=1001    −1.001
                              __
                                 T0T000
             11×100            −   1100           borrow 100×, do division
                               _
                      10T000     TT1T00           TT1T00<T01000, set T
        11×11×1000+1=1TT1001   −T11T00T
                               
                                 1TTT01000
            11T×100             −    11T00        borrow 100×, do division
                                ___
                    1T1T01TT     1TTTT0100        1TTTT0100>1T1T01TT, set 1
     11T×11T×1000+1=11111001    − 11111001
                                __
                                     1T10T000
           11T1×100                 −  11T100      borrow 100×, do division
                                    __
                       10T0T01TT     1T0T0T00      T01010T11<1T0T0T00<10T0T01TT, set 0
     11T1×11T1×1000+1=1TT1T11001    −  TT1T00      return 100×
                                    _
                                     1T10T000000
                                         ... 
Hence  = 1.25992110 = 1.1T1 000 111 001 T01 00T 1T1 T10 111bal3.

Applications

In computer design 

In the early days of computing, a few experimental Soviet computers were built with balanced ternary instead of binary, the most famous being the Setun, built by Nikolay Brusentsov and Sergei Sobolev. The notation has a number of computational advantages over traditional binary and ternary. Particularly, the plus–minus consistency cuts down the carry rate in multi-digit multiplication, and the rounding–truncation equivalence cuts down the carry rate in rounding on fractions. In balanced ternary, the one-digit multiplication table remains one-digit and has no carry and the addition table has only two carries out of nine entries, compared to unbalanced ternary with one and three respectively.

"The complexity of arithmetic circuitry for balanced ternary arithmetic is not much greater than it is for the binary system, and a given number requires only  as many digit positions for its representation.""Perhaps the symmetric properties and simple arithmetic of this number system will prove to be quite important some day."

Other applications 
The theorem that every integer has a unique representation in balanced ternary was used by Leonhard Euler to justify the identity of formal power series

Balanced ternary has other applications besides computing. For example, a classical two-pan balance, with one weight for each power of 3, can weigh relatively heavy objects accurately with a small number of weights, by moving weights between the two pans and the table. For example, with weights for each power of 3 through 81, a 60-gram object (6010 = 1T1T0bal3) will be balanced perfectly with an 81 gram weight in the other pan, the 27 gram weight in its own pan, the 9 gram weight in the other pan, the 3 gram weight in its own pan, and the 1 gram weight set aside.

Similarly, consider a currency system with coins worth 1¤, 3¤, 9¤, 27¤, 81¤. If the buyer and the seller each have only one of each kind of coin, any transaction up to 121¤ is possible. For example, if the price is 7¤ (710 = 1T1bal3), the buyer pays 1¤ + 9¤ and receives 3¤ in change.

They may also provide a more natural representation for the qutrit and systems that use it.

See also

 Signed-digit representation
 Methods of computing square roots
 Numeral system
 Qutrit
 Salamis Tablet
 Ternary computer
 Setun, a ternary computer
 Ternary logic

References

External links

Development of ternary computers at Moscow State University
Representation of Fractional Numbers in Balanced Ternary
"Third base", ternary and balanced ternary number systems
The Balanced Ternary Number System (includes decimal integer to balanced ternary converter)
 
Balanced (Signed) Ternary Notation  by Brian J. Shelburne (PDF file)
The ternary calculating machine of Thomas Fowler by Mark Glusker

Computer arithmetic
Non-standard positional numeral systems
Ternary computers
Numeral systems

de:Ternärsystem#Balanciert